Oliyum Oliyum is a 2009 Indian Tamil-language film directed by Shakthi Chellam and starring Prabha, Aswati, Anand Babu and Pragathi.

Cast 
 Prabha as Ramu
 Aswati as Selvi 
Anand Babu as Ramu's elder brother 
Pragathi as Ramu's elder brother's wife
 Mohan as Gopal
 Palam Kalyanasundaram as Constable Govindaswamy
 Scissor Manohar as Mookuthi and Pannari
 Geetha as Poonkodi

Production 
The film is set in pre-Independence India and is produced by NRIs Sivakumar and Rajeev Venkataraman. The film marks the return of Anand Babu in the lead role after a hiatus. The film features social worker Balam Kalyanasundaram and was shot at Ramoji Film City.

Reception 
Pavithra Srinivasan from Rediff.com opined that "With all these ingredients, you're definitely guaranteed a riot of humour with a production like this". A critic from Behindwoods said that " Throw in some amateurish direction and dialogues, above all some crass scenes that qualify for more than just skin show, you get the concoction called Oliyum Oliyum".

References

External links